Snow flea is a common name for several arthropods, not including true fleas:

 Boreidae,  a family of scorpionflies known as snow fleas in the British Isles, especially:
 Boreus hyemalis a species of scorpionfly that crawls on snow
 Hypogastrura nivicola, a species of springtail known as snow flea in North America

 Several springtails of the family Isotomidae and the genus Desoria, known as snow fleas in Europe